Edward John Hearn (born 8 June 1979) is a British sports promoter who is chairman of Matchroom Sport and Professional Darts Corporation. Hearn is the son of promoter Barry Hearn, the founder of Matchroom Sport.

Education
Hearn was a student at the private Brentwood School, Essex. He failed to get into sixth form at Brentwood School as he performed poorly on his GCSEs. Hearn played cricket and football to a high standard, and his father Barry petitioned the school to let him stay on for his sporting record, but the school refused. Hearn said, "I grew up thinking I was a hard nut and in Brentwood School I was. Anywhere else I was a pansy." He then went to Havering Sixth Form College in Hornchurch, which was not selective. Barry encouraged Hearn to study by promising him £1,000 for a C or better grade in his A-level subjects, which were media studies, physical education and business studies. Hearn achieved two Cs and one A.

Boxing promoter
Matchroom Sport was founded by Eddie's father, Barry Hearn. After leaving education, Eddie Hearn started a career in the West End at a sports management company representing golfers, eventually moving on to promote online poker with Matchroom with the events being broadcast worldwide. In the UK, they were broadcast by Channel 4, Channel 5 and Sky Sports. He met Audley Harrison at a poker game and agreed to help him rebuild his career, subsequently getting Harrison a fight with heavyweight champion David Haye for his WBA title, signalling the growth of Matchroom Boxing.

In 2015, Hearn signed an exclusive televised boxing deal with UK broadcaster Sky Sports to broadcast up to 20 shows a year. The deal was in place for 6 years and lasted until 2021.

Hearn promotes and has promoted many world champions since joining Matchroom Sport, including Anthony Joshua, Canelo Álvarez, Gennady Golovkin, Oleksandr Usyk, Vasyl Lomachenko, Katie Taylor and many others.

Hearn has promoted some large events in recent times, including Carl Froch vs. George Groves II in 2014 and Anthony Joshua vs. Wladimir Klitschko in 2017, both of which took place at Wembley Stadium with 80,000 and 90,000 fans in attendance respectively.

In May 2018, Hearn revealed boxing's first-ever $1 billion boxing deal (£750 million) as Matchroom and streaming service DAZN signed an agreement to stream shows across the United States. At the heart of the deal, Hearn and Matchroom Boxing would stage 16 shows in America, which would be streamed exclusively on DAZN in the U.S., while 16 of his UK shows will also be shown on the platform.

In 2019, Hearn agreed a deal to promote a professional boxing match between YouTube personalities KSI and Logan Paul, which took place on 9 November 2019 at the Staples Center in Los Angeles. This match was heavily criticised by boxing fans across the globe; they claimed KSI and Paul were not suitable to be promoted by Hearn, due to their lack of experience. Referring to their first amateur fight which Hearn had previously declined to promote, he described it as "a really good fight and I told myself I'm doing the rematch."

In the same year, Hearn came under criticism for staging Andy Ruiz Jr. vs. Anthony Joshua II in Saudi Arabia, due to the country's poor human rights record. He defended the decision by stating that Saudi Arabia wanted to improve its image and that his job "is to provide the best opportunities for our fighters."

In April 2021, Hearn's father stepped aside from the role of chairman to become president of the group in an advisory role, paving the way for him to become Chairman of the Matchroom Sport Group of Companies.

On 8 May 2021, Hearn promoted Canelo Álvarez vs. Billy Joe Saunders in front of 73,126 fans at the AT&T Stadium in Arlington, Texas, which broke the all-time attendance record for an indoor boxing event in the United States. Later that same month, Hearn became involved in a war of words with rival promoters Bob Arum of Top Rank, and Frank Warren of Queensberry Promotions, over the failure of a deal coming to fruition for a proposed Tyson Fury vs. Anthony Joshua fight, accusing them of making "absolutely zero attempt to try and save the Anthony Joshua fight".

On 3 June 2021, Hearn announced that he had signed a 5-year deal that meant he would be taking his entire stable of Matchroom fighters to streaming service DAZN, signalling the end of Matchroom's previous partnership with Sky Sports in the UK and Ireland. As part of the deal, all Matchroom events will be shown exclusively on DAZN worldwide, and "at least 16 Matchroom UK fights [will be] annually available exclusively to DAZN subscribers in the UK and Ireland for the first time, from July 2021 onwards".

Personal life

Hearn lives near Billericay in Essex with his wife Chloe and their two daughters. He generally has a good relationship with his fighters, and is good friends with former WBC cruiserweight champion Tony Bellew whose career he helped turn around. In 2020, unified heavyweight champion Anthony Joshua, whom Hearn has promoted since Joshua's professional debut in 2013, said that he "and Eddie will always have a great friendship."

After Hearn promoted a boxing event in Fresno, California in 2021, the Mayor of Fresno, Jerry Dyer, declared 16 October to be celebrated as "Matchroom Boxing and Eddie Hearn Day".

Bibliography 
Relentless: 12 Rounds to Success (2020)

References

External links
Eddie Hearn's account on Instagram
Eddie Hearn's account on Twitter

Living people
People educated at Brentwood School, Essex
British boxing promoters
1979 births